A Kar Ka A Chit A Hnit Ka Myittar is a 1979 Burmese black-and-white drama film, directed by Thukha starring Kawleikgyin Ne Win, Kyaw Hein and Swe Zin Htaik.

Cast
Kawleikgyin Ne Win as U Aww
Kyaw Hein as Ba Tint
Swe Zin Htaik as Khin Khin Nu
Sein Khin as Daw Khin Sein
San Ma Tu as U Kun Zaw

Awards

References

1979 films
1970s Burmese-language films
Films shot in Myanmar
Burmese black-and-white films
1979 drama films
Burmese drama films